The 3 arrondissements of the Haute-Marne department are:
 Arrondissement of Chaumont (prefecture of the Haute-Marne department: Chaumont) with 158 communes. The population of the arrondissement was 64,148 in 2016.  
 Arrondissement of Langres (subprefecture: Langres) with 157 communes.  The population of the arrondissement was 43,943 in 2016.  
 Arrondissement of Saint-Dizier (subprefecture: Saint-Dizier) with 111 communes.  The population of the arrondissement was 69,993 in 2016.

History

In 1800 the arrondissements of Chaumont, Langres and Wassy were established. The arrondissement of Wassy was disbanded in 1926. It was restored in 1940, but the subprefecture was moved to Saint-Dizier.

References

Haute-Marne